Johan Arnd Aasgaard  (April 5, 1876 – January 13, 1966) was an American Lutheran church leader.

Biography
Johan Arnd Aasgaard was born in Albert Lea, Minnesota. He was educated at St. Olaf College in Northfield, Minnesota (class of 1901). He graduated from the United Church Seminary in Saint Paul, Minnesota (now known as Luther Seminary). He was ordained a minister in the Norwegian Lutheran Church of America, later known as the Evangelical Lutheran Church.

Aasgaard was pastor of Christ Lutheran Church in De Forest, Wisconsin from 1901 to 1911. He taught at United Church Seminary from 1906 to 1907. He served as president of Concordia College in Moorhead, Minnesota from 1911 to 1925. Aasgaard was President of the Norwegian Lutheran Church of America from 1925 to 1954.<ref>{{Cite web |url=http://www.cord.edu/dept/sports/about/history.php |title=College History (Concordia College) Our Heritage. 1847–Present (Christ Lutheran Church) |access-date=2009-08-08 |archive-url=https://web.archive.org/web/20080907012530/http://www.cord.edu/dept/sports/about/history.php |archive-date=2008-09-07 |url-status=dead }}</ref>

Aasgaard subsequently helped lay groundwork for the merger that resulted in formation of American Lutheran Church in 1960. The American Lutheran Church resulted from the merger of the Evangelical Lutheran Church (United States) with the United Evangelical Lutheran Church and a predecessor church body known as the American Lutheran Church.

He was appointed Commander of the Royal Norwegian Order of St. Olav in 1928 and received the Grand Cross in 1945. The personal papers and files of Johan Arnd Aasgaard are maintained in the archives of Luther Seminary in Saint Paul, Minnesota.

Aasgaard died of pneumonia in a hospital in Cokato, Minnesota at age 89.

Selected worksQuarter Centennial Souvenir of St. Olaf College, 1874–1899 (Northfield News Print. 1900)Address at seventieth anniversary of Luther College (Lutheran Herald, Volume 7. 1933)Symbols of the Evangelical Lutheran Church—My Christian Faith  (Augsburg Publishing House. 1935)

References

Further reading
Gullixson, T.F., J.C.K. Preus, E.C. Reinertson (editors) Norsemen Found a Church   (Augsburg Publishing. 1953)
Nelson, Clifford E. Lutherans in North America  (Augsburg Fortress Publishers. 1980)
Lovoll,Odd S. The Promise of America  (University of Minnesota Press. 1999)
Lovoll, Odd S. Norwegians on the Prairie: Ethnicity and the Development of the Country Town''  (Minnesota Historical Society Press. 2007)

External links
Aasgaard House at Concordia College
Concordia College Archives

St. Olaf College alumni
20th-century American Lutheran clergy
1876 births
1966 deaths
Luther Seminary alumni
American people of Norwegian descent
People from Albert Lea, Minnesota
People from DeForest, Wisconsin